The 2012 Conference USA football season was an NCAA football season that was from August 2012 through January 2013.  Conference USA consists of 12 football members separated into 2 divisions: East Carolina, Marshall, Memphis, Southern Miss, UAB, UCF make up the eastern division, while Houston, Rice, SMU, Tulane, Tulsa, and UTEP comprise the western division.

The 2012 football season marks the 18th season of the conference's existence and 17th of football competition; although C-USA was established in 1995, it did not begin football competition until 1996. In addition, the season will be the last to feature participation from Houston, Memphis, SMU and UCF, as the four schools intend to leave the conference for the American Athletic Conference on July 1, 2013.

UCF will be eligible to compete for both the Conference USA championship and a bowl game this season with its appeal of a one-year football postseason ban not scheduled to be heard until next year. The NCAA has set the hearing for late January. Should UCF lose its appeal, it would serve its football ban in 2013 when it enters the Big East.

Previous season

Southern Miss won the conference championship for the first time, defeating the Houston Cougars 49–28.

Regular season

Week One

Week Two

Week Three

Week Four

Week Five

Week Six

Week Seven

Week Eight

Week Nine

Week Ten

Week Eleven

Week Twelve

Week Thirteen

Players of the week

Rankings

Records against other conferences

Bowl games 

(C-USA teams in bold)

Attendance

Bowl eligibility

Bowl eligible (5)

Tulsa (9–3) became bowl eligible on October 11 after defeating UTEP.
UCF (9–3) became bowl eligible on October 27 after defeating Marshall.
East Carolina (8–4) became bowl eligible on November 3 after defeating Houston.
SMU (6–6) became bowl eligible on November 24 after defeating Tulsa.
Rice (6–6) became bowl eligible on November 24 after defeating UTEP.

Bowl ineligible (7)

Southern Miss (0–12) lost the ability to become bowl eligible on October 20 after losing to Marshall.
Memphis (4–8) lost the ability to become bowl eligible on October 27 after losing to SMU.
UAB (3–9) lost the ability to become bowl eligible on October 27 after losing to Tulane.
UTEP (3–9) lost the ability to become bowl eligible on October 27 after losing to Houston.
Tulane (2–10) lost the ability to become bowl eligible on November 3 after losing to Rice.
Houston (5–7) lost the ability to become bowl eligible on November 17 after losing to Marshall.
Marshall (5–7) lost the ability to become bowl eligible on November 23 after losing to East Carolina.

References